The 2008 SAFF Championship was an international football tournament held in Sri Lanka and Maldives from 3 to 14 June 2008. The national teams involved in the tournament were required to register a squad of 20 players. The position listed for each player is per the squad list in the official match reports by the SAFF.

Bangladesh
Coach:  Abu Yusuf
 Aminul Haque
 Biplob Bhattacharjee
 Hassan Al-Mamun
 Wali Faisal
 Mohammed Ariful Islam
 Rajani Kanta Barman
 Arup Kumar Baidya
 Atiqur Rahman Meshu
 Kazi Mofazzal Hossain Shaikat
 Nazrul Islam
 Anamul Haque Sharif
 Faisal Mahmud
 Zahid Parvez Chowdhury
 Mamunul Islam
 Arif Khan Joy
 Mohamed Abul Hossain
 Arman Aziz
 Mehedi Hasan Ujjal
 Zahid Hasan Ameli
 Abdul Baten Mojumdar Komol

India
Coach:  Bob Houghton
 Baichung Bhutia
 Mahesh Gawli
 Deepak Kumar Mondal
 Steven Dias
 Climax Lawrence
 Renedy Singh
 Gouramangi Singh
 N.S. Manju
 Pappachen Pradeep
 Subrata Pal
 Sunil Chhetri
 Anwar Ali
 Sushil Kumar Singh
 Mehrajuddin Wadoo
 Samir Subash Naik
 Subhasish Roy Chowdhury
 Abhishek Yadav
 Manjit Singh
 Sampath Kuttimani
 Bungo Thomchok Singh

Pakistan
Coach:  Akhtar Mohiuddin
 Naveeed Akram
 Arif Mehmood
 Zahid Hameed
 Sammar Ishaq
 Imran Niazi
 Abdul Aziz
 Muhammad Imran
 Muhammad Irfan
 Nasrullah Khan
 Adnan Ahmed
 Bilal Rafiq
 Atif Bashir
 Farooq Shah
 Jadid Khan Pathan
 Kashif Siddiqi

Nepal
Coach:  Thomas Flath
 Nirajan Rayamajhi
 Sagar Thapa
 Rakesh Shrestha
 Bikash Malla
 Lok Bandhu Gurung
 K.C. Anjan
 Bijay Gurung
 Ju Manu Rai
 Bishan Gauchan
 Chun Bahadur Thapa
 Sandeep Rai
 Ananta Raj Thapa
 Parbat Pandey
 Raju Tamang
 Ramesh Budhathoki
 Bikash Singh Chhetri
 Suman Subedi
 Niranjan Khadka

Maldives
Coach:  Jozef Jankech
 Ahmed Thoriq
 Mohamed Imran
 Mohamed Ismail
 Ibrahim Fazeel
 Assad Abdul Ghanee
 Ahmed Ammaty Saeed
 Mohamed Jameel
 Ali Ashfaq
 Mukhthar Naseer
 Mohamed Shifan
 Mohamed Sobah
 Ali Umar
 Shamveel Qasim
 Mohamed Bakka Arif

References

2008 in sports
Football competitions in Sri Lanka
SAFF Championship
Association football tournament squads
SAFF Championship squads